Saavi is a 1985 Indian Tamil-language crime thriller film, written and directed by Karthik Raghunath. The film stars Sathyaraj, Jaishankar, Saritha and Nizhalgal Ravi, with music composed by Gangai Amaran. It is a remake of 1985 Hindi film Aitbaar which itself is based on the 1954 American film Dial M for Murder. The film was released on 10 October 1985.

Plot 
Vijaykumar, an ex-professional tennis player, is married to wealthy socialite Latha, who has an affair with a stage playback singer Anand. When Vijay retires in response to her complaint about his busy schedule, he secretly discovers the affair and in turn, decides to murder her. The murder is out of revenge as well as  Vijay's plan to ensure that her money will continue to finance his comfortable lifestyle.

Vijay meets an acquaintance from The President's Club: Sathish – a part-time criminal and drug dealer. After secretly following him, Vijay blackmails Sathish into murdering Latha. Vijay tells Sathish about Latha's affair. Six months prior, Vijay stole her handbag, which contained a love letter from Anand and anonymously blackmailed her, however, Vijay tricks Sathish into leaving his fingerprints on the letter. Vijay offers to pay Sathish  to Kill Latha, if Sathish refuses, Vijay will turn him in to the police as Latha's blackmailer.

When Sathish agrees, Vijay explains his plan to murder Latha the following evening. His plan consists of taking Anand to a party while leaving Latha at home and hiding the key outside the front door of their house. Sathish will then sneak in when Latha is asleep and hide behind the curtains in front of the French door to the gardens. At 10:50, Vijay will telephone the house from the party so that when she answers the phone, Sathish can kill Latha. He will then leave the French door open and exit through the front door, hiding the key again while leaving signs that suggests a burglary has gone wrong.

The next night, Sathish enters the house while Latha is in bed and waits. At the party, Vijay discovers his watch has stopped, so he phones the house later than intended. When Latha comes to the phone. Sathish tries to strangle her with his scarf, but she manages to grab a pair of scissors and kill him. She picks up the telephone and pleads for help. Vijay tells her not to do anything until he arrives home. When he returns to home, he calls the police and sends Latha to bed. Before the police arrive, Vijay moves what he thinks is Latha's key from the Sathish's pocket into her handbag, plants Anand's letter on Sathish and destroys Sathish's scarf, replacing it with Latha's own stocking in an attempt to incriminate her.

The following day, Vijay persuades Latha into hiding the fact that he told her not call the police immediately. CID Inspector Shankar arrives and questions Vijay and Latha's conflicting statements. When Shankar says Sathish must have entered through the front door, Vijay falsely claims to have seen Sathish at the time Latha's handbag was stolen and suggests that Sathish made a copy of her key. Shankar does not believe this because no key was found on Sathish's body. Shankar arrests Latha after concluding that she killed Sathish for blackmailing her. Latha is found guilty and sentenced to death.

On the day before Latha's scheduled execution, Anand visits Vijay, saying he has devised a story for Vijay to tell the police in order to save Latha's life. Vijay is concerned because Anand's Story is what actually did happen. Anad says that Vijay bribed Sathish into murdering Latha, however, Vijay says the story is too unrealistic. Shankar arrives and Anand hides in the bedroom. Shankar asks Vijay about large sum of cash he has been spending and tricks him in to revealing that he has the latchkey is in his raincoat and then inquires about Vijay's attached case. Vijay claims to have lost the case, but Anand who is still in the bedroom finds it filled with bank notes on the bed. Deducing that the money was Vijay's intended payoff to Sathish, Anand stops Shankar from leaving and explains his story.

Vijay fabricates another cover story by saying the cash was a payment for Latha's blackmailer Sathish. Shankar accepts Vijay's explanation and Anand leaves angrily. Shankar swaps his own raincoat with Vijay's and as soon as Vijay leaves he uses Vijay's key to re – enter the house, followed by Anand. Shankar had already discovered that the key in Latha's handbag was Sathish's latchkey and figured out that Sathish had put the key back in its hiding place after unlocking the door. Shankar now suspects Vijay of having conspired with Sathish and develops an elaborate plan to confirm this.

Plain clothed policemen bring Latha from prison to the house. She tries unsuccessfully to unlock the door with the key in her handbag then enters through the garden, but, she is unaware of the hidden key. Shankar has Latha's handbag returned to the Police station and Vijay tries to take it back after discovering that he has no key. The key from Latha's bag does not work, so he uses the hidden key to open the door, proving that he is guilty. With his escape routes blocked by Shankar and another policeman, Vijay calmly fires his gun then dies.

Cast 
 Sathyaraj as Vijaykumar
 Jaishankar as CID Inspector Shankar
 Saritha as Latha
 Nizhalgal Ravi as Anand
 Amjathkumar as Sathish (or) Sumkumar
 V. Gopalakrishnan as Public Prosecutor
 Kallapetti Singaram as a Hotel Manager
 Ganthimathi as Pachaiyamma
 Ennatha Kannaiah as Press Reporter
 Anuradha in item number
 Disco Shanti in item number

Production 
Saavi was Sathyaraj's first film which featured him in a leading role, even though his role had negative shades.

Soundtrack 
Music was by Gangai Amaran and lyrics were by Vaali.

Release and reception
Saavi was released on 10 October 1985. Jayamanmadhan of Kalki called it a different film but noted that it would have been an interesting film if the length had been reduced at the right places.

References

External links 
 

1980s crime thriller films
1980s mystery films
1980s Tamil-language films
1985 films
Fictional portrayals of the Tamil Nadu Police
Films about contract killing in India
Films scored by Gangai Amaran
Films set in Chennai
Indian crime thriller films
Indian remakes of American films
Tamil remakes of Hindi films